Mezzana Bigli is a comune (municipality) in the Province of Pavia in the Italian region Lombardy, located about 50 km southwest of Milan and about 25 km southwest of Pavia in the Lomellina traditional region, near the left bank of the Po River and its confluence with the Agogna.

References

Cities and towns in Lombardy